Hwang Sang-hoi is a North Korean former footballer. He represented North Korea on at least two occasions between 1980 and 1982, scoring twice.

Career statistics

International

International goals
Scores and results list North Korea's goal tally first, score column indicates score after each North Korea goal.

References

Date of birth unknown
Living people
North Korean footballers
North Korea international footballers
Association football midfielders
1980 AFC Asian Cup players
Footballers at the 1982 Asian Games
Asian Games competitors for North Korea
Year of birth missing (living people)